Goodies is an album by jazz trombonist and arranger J. J. Johnson with a big band recorded in 1965 for the RCA Victor label.

Reception

In his review for AllMusic, Jason Ankeny wrote, "Goodies captures J.J. Johnson's mid-'60s big band in full gallop. ...the music marries the nimble grooves of soul-jazz with the big, bold sensibilities of swing to stunning effect. Mastering adrenaline and atmosphere with equal aplomb, the music shifts effortlessly from powder keg dance melodies to lush, luminous ballad".

Track listing
All compositions by J. J. Johnson except where noted.
 "Feeling Good" (Anthony Newley, Leslie Bricusse) – 2:25
 "The Seventh Son" (Willie Dixon) – 2:42
 "How Insensitive" (Antônio Carlos Jobim, Vinícius de Moraes, Norman Gimbel) – 2:45
 "Pense à Moi" (Maurice "Bugs" Bower, Jack Wolf, Jaques Datin) – 2:02
 "008" – 2:06
 "In the Name of Love" (Estelle Levitt, Kenny Rankin) – 2:03
 "G'won Train" (Patricia Brown) – 2:57
 "No Particular Place to Go" (Chuck Berry) – 2:10
 "Água de Beber" (Jobim, de Moraes, Gimbel) – 2:28
 "Incidental Blues" – 2:40	
 "I'm All Smiles" (Michael Leonard, Herbert Martin) – 1:57
 "Billy Boy" – 2:51
Recorded at RCA Victor's Studio A in New York City on July 12, 1965 (tracks 4 & 9), July 13, 1965 (tracks 1, 3, 7 & 11), July 19, 1965 (tracks 2, 6 & 8) and July 20, 1965 (tracks 5, 10 & 12)

Personnel 
J. J. Johnson – trombone, arranger
Clark Terry – trumpet, flugelhorn
Alan Raph, Tony Studd (tracks 1, 3, 7, 11) – bass trombone
Ray Sterling – mellophone
Jerome Richardson – alto saxophone, flute, tenor saxophone
Phil Bodner, Romeo Penque (tracks 4, 5, 9, 12) – reeds, flute
Danny Bank – baritone saxophone, flute, bass clarinet (tracks 1–3, 6–8 & 11)
Barry Galbraith (tracks 2, 6 & 8), Carl Lynch (tracks 2, 6 & 8), Bucky Pizzarelli (tracks 1, 3, 4, 7, 9 & 11) – guitar
Dick Hyman – piano, arranger (tracks 5, 10 & 12)
Richard Davis – bass
Sol Gubin (tracks 2, 6 & 8), Osie Johnson (tracks 5, 10 & 12), Bob Rosengarden (tracks: 1, 3, 4, 7, 9 & 11) – drums
Doug Allen (tracks 4 & 9), John Pacheco (tracks 4 & 9), Phil Kraus (tracks 1, 3, 7 & 11), Warren Smith (tracks 2, 6, 8) – Percussion
Marlene VerPlanck (tracks 4 & 9), Osie Johnson (tracks 2, 6 & 8) – vocals
Unidentified choir – backing vocals (tracks 1, 3, 7 & 11)
Billy Byers (tracks 4 & 9), Slide Hampton (tracks 2, 6 & 8) – arranger

References 

1966 albums
RCA Records albums
J. J. Johnson albums
Albums arranged by Billy Byers
Albums arranged by Slide Hampton